Max Emiliano Nowry (born March 16, 1990) is an American Greco-Roman wrestler. He is a three-time gold medalist at the Pan American Wrestling Championships. He has also competed in freestyle wrestling on a few occasions.

Career 

In 2013, he represented the United States at the Summer Universiade where he finished in 5th place in the Greco-Roman 55 kg event.

In 2018, he won the silver medal in the Greco-Roman 55 kg event at the Pan American Wrestling Championships held in Lima, Peru.

He won the gold medal in the Greco-Roman 55 kg event at the 2019 Pan American Wrestling Championships held in Buenos Aires, Argentina. Later that year he won one of the bronze medals in the freestyle 57 kg event at the 2019 Military World Games held in Wuhan, China. In 2019 he also competed in the Greco-Roman 55 kg event at the 2019 World Wrestling Championships held in Nur-Sultan, Kazakhstan without winning a medal. He won his first match against Fabian Schmitt but he was eliminated from the competition in his next match against Khorlan Zhakansha. Zhakansha went on to win the silver medal.

In 2020, he won the gold medal in the Greco-Roman 55 kg event at the Pan American Wrestling Championships held in Ottawa, Canada.

In 2022, he won the bronze medal in his event at the Matteo Pellicone Ranking Series 2022 held in Rome, Italy.

Achievements

References

External links 

 

Living people
Place of birth missing (living people)
American male sport wrestlers
Competitors at the 2013 Summer Universiade
1990 births
Pan American Wrestling Championships medalists
20th-century American people
21st-century American people